Verzeille is a commune in the Aude department in southern France. Verzeille station has rail connections to Carcassonne and Limoux.

Population

See also
Communes of the Aude department

References

Communes of Aude